Soy el Mismo (English: I am the Same) may refer to:

Soy el Mismo (Eddie Santiago album) or the title song, 1991
Soy el Mismo (Prince Royce album), 2013
"Soy el Mismo" (song), the title song